Point Break is a 1991 action film.

Point Break may also refer to:

 Point Break (2015 film), a remake of the 1991 film
 Point Break Live!, a play and parody of the 1991 film by Jaime Keeling
 Point Break (band)
 Point break, a type of surf break